İkizören is a village in the Yapraklı District of Çankırı Province in Turkey. Its population is 181 (2021). Before the 2013 reorganisation, it was a town (belde).

References

Villages in Yapraklı District